
Prudhomme or Prud'homme (sometimes anglicised to Pruden) is a surname of French origin. The surname spread to the Canary Islands where it was Hispanicized to Perdomo. The surname spread to New Spain and is now common in Colombia, Venezuela, Cuba & Honduras. The surname derives from the Old French prud'homme, meaning a wise, honest or sensible man.

Notable people with the surname
People with the surname Prud'homme or Prudhomme:
 Alex Prud'homme, American nonfiction writer and journalist
 Christian Prudhomme (born 1960), French sports journalist and general director of the Tour de France
 Don Prudhomme (born 1941), American dragster racer
Donna Prudhomme (died 1991), murder victim found in the Texas Killing Fields
 Emilio Prud'Homme (1856–1932), lyricist of the Dominican anthem
 Eustache Prud'homme (1818–1891), French-Canadian political figure
 Georges Prud'Homme (1899-?), Canadian boxer
 Louis-Marie Prudhomme (1752–1830), French journalist
 Marcel Prud'homme (1934-2017), French-Canadian politician
 Michel Preud'homme (born 1959), Belgian football goalkeeper
 Paul Prudhomme (1940–2015), American celebrity chef
 Sully Prudhomme (1839–1907), French poet, essayist and Nobel laureate in Literature

Characters
 M. and Mme. Joseph Prudhomme, 19th-century cartoon characters created by Henri Monnier

See also
 Prudhomme (disambiguation)

References

Surnames
French-language surnames